Live in Los Angeles may refer to:

 Live in Los Angeles (Paul McCartney album), 2010
 Live in Los Angeles (X album), 2005
 Live in Los Angeles (Zameer album), 2010
 Live from Los Angeles, a 1967 album by Oliver Nelson